The 2015 Rutland County Council election took place on 7 May 2015 to elect members of Rutland County Council in England. This was on the same day as other local elections.

Results summary

Braunston and Belton

Cottesmore

Exton

Greetham

Ketton

Langham

Lyddington

Martinsthorpe

Normanton

Oakham North East

Oakham North West

Oakham South East

Oakham South West

Ryhall and Casterton

Uppingham

Whissendine

References

External links 
2015 elections on Rutland County Council website

2015 English local elections
May 2015 events in the United Kingdom
2015